Puntone dei Fraciòn is a 3,202-metre-high mountain in the Lepontine Alps, located on the border between the Swiss cantons of Ticino and Graubünden. It is the highest peak of the Calanca valley (Graubünden). On its west side (Ticino) it overlooks the valley of Malvaglia. It lies approximately halfway between the Vogelberg and the Zapporthorn.

References

External links
Puntone dei Fraciòn on Hikr

Mountains of the Alps
Alpine three-thousanders
Mountains of Switzerland
Mountains of Graubünden
Mountains of Ticino
Graubünden–Ticino border
Lepontine Alps
Mesocco